Note — many sporting events did not take place because of World War II

1942 in sports describes the year's events in world sport.

American football
 NFL Championship: the Washington Redskins won 14–6	over the Chicago Bears at Griffith Stadium
 1 January – The Rose Bowl not being available for war-related reasons, the Oregon State Beavers play the Duke Blue Devils for that championship at the latter's venue of Durham, North Carolina, beating the Blue Devils, 20–16.
 Ohio State Buckeyes – college football national championship (coached by Paul Brown)

Association football
 FIFA World Cup – not held due to World War II.
 La Liga is won by Valencia CF.
 German football championship won by Schalke 04
 Serie A won by A.S. Roma
 Primeira Liga won by S.L. Benfica
 Japan defeat Republic Of China, Manchukuo, Mongolia, by 6–1, 3–0, 12–0 during 8–20 August 1942 to win Manchuria 10th Anniversary Tournament.
 There is no major football competition in England, Scotland or France due to World War II. In England, several regional leagues are played but statistics from these are not counted in players’ figures.

Australian rules football
 Victorian Football League – Essendon wins the 46th VFL Premiership, beating Richmond 19.18 (132) to 11.13 (79) in the 1942 VFL Grand Final.

Baseball
 January 4 – Hall of Fame election: Rogers Hornsby is elected to the Baseball Hall of Fame, getting 78 percent of the vote. Further selections of 19th-century players are delayed.
 January 15 – President Franklin D. Roosevelt gives baseball the go-ahead to play despite World War II. FDR encourages more night baseball so that war workers may attend. The Cubs, who had signed contracts to install lights at Wrigley Field, drop their plans because of the military need for the material. There will be no lights at Wrigley for 46 more years.
 World Series – St. Louis Cardinals (NL) defeat New York Yankees (AL), 4 games to 1.
 Negro League World Series – Kansas City Monarchs (NAL) defeat Homestead Grays (NNL), 4 games to none.
 The Winnipeg Maroons win the Northern League championship. It would also be their last.
 Leones Caracas, as most successful professional baseball club in Venezuela, officially founded on May 7.

Basketball
NBL Championship
Oshkosh All-Stars win two games to one over the Fort Wayne Zollner Pistons

Events
 The tenth South American Basketball Championship in Santiago is won by Argentina.

Cricket
Events
 There is no first-class cricket in England or Australia due to World War II. A few first-class matches are played in the West Indies, South Africa and New Zealand but are not part of any official competition.
 Former England international Andy Ducat dies of a heart attack on 23 July during a game at Lord's Cricket Ground whilst playing for his unit of the Home Guard from Surrey against another from Sussex. 
India
 Ranji Trophy – Bombay beat Mysore by an innings and 281 runs.
 Bombay Pentangular – not contested
West Indies
 Trinidad are dismissed for just 16 against Barbados during a game at the Bridgetown Oval – still the lowest team innings total in West Indian first-class cricket history.

Cycling
Tour de France
 not contested due to World War II
Giro d'Italia
 not contested due to World War II

Figure skating
World Figure Skating Championships
 not contested due to World War II

Golf
Men's professional
 Masters Tournament – Byron Nelson
 U.S. Open – not played due to World War II
 British Open – not played due to World War II
 PGA Championship – Sam Snead
Men's amateur
 British Amateur – not played due to World War II
 U.S. Amateur – not played due to World War II
Women's professional
 Women's Western Open – Betty Jameson
 Titleholders Championship – Dorothy Kirby

Horse racing
Steeplechases
 Cheltenham Gold Cup – Medoc II
 Grand National – not held due to World War II
Hurdle races
 Champion Hurdle – Forestation
Flat races
 Australia – Melbourne Cup won by Colonus
 Canada – King's Plate won by Ten To Ace
 France – Prix de l'Arc de Triomphe won by Djebel
 Ireland – Irish Derby Stakes won by Windsor Slipper
 English Triple Crown Races:
 2,000 Guineas Stakes – Big Game
 The Derby – Watling Street
 St. Leger Stakes – Sun Chariot
 United States Triple Crown Races:
 Kentucky Derby – Shut Out
 Preakness Stakes – Alsab
 Belmont Stakes – Shut Out

Ice hockey
 National Hockey League
 Stanley Cup – Toronto Maple Leafs won 4 games to 3 over the Detroit Red Wings
 The Leafs won the series after losing the first three games, a feat that has only happened twice since then in North American professional sports.
 NHL scoring leader – Bryan Hextall, New York Rangers
 Hart Memorial Trophy for the NHL's Most Valuable Player – Tom Anderson, Brooklyn Americans

Motor racing
Events
 No major races are held anywhere worldwide due to World War II

Rowing
The Boat Race
 Oxford and Cambridge Boat Race is not contested due to World War II

Rugby league
1942 New Zealand rugby league season
1942 NSWRFL season
1941–42 Northern Rugby Football League Wartime Emergency League season / 1942–43 Northern Rugby Football League Wartime Emergency League season

Rugby union
 Five Nations Championship series is not contested due to World War II

Speed skating
Speed Skating World Championships
 not contested due to World War II

Tennis
Australia
 Australian Men's Singles Championship – not contested
 Australian Women's Singles Championship – not contested
England
 Wimbledon Men's Singles Championship – not contested
 Wimbledon Women's Singles Championship – not contested
France
 French Men's Singles Championship – Bernard Destremau (France) defeats Marcel Bernard (France) — score to be ascertained
 French Women's Singles Championship – Alice Weiwers (Luxembourg) † details to be ascertained
USA
 American Men's Singles Championship – Ted Schroeder (USA) defeats Frank Parker (USA) 8–6, 7–5, 3–6, 4–6, 6–2
 American Women's Singles Championship – Pauline Betz Addie (USA) defeats Louise Brough Clapp (USA) 4–6, 6–1, 6–4
Davis Cup
 1942 International Lawn Tennis Challenge – not contested

Awards
 Associated Press Male Athlete of the Year: Frank Sinkwich, College football
 Associated Press Female Athlete of the Year: Gloria Callen, Swimming

Notes
 Owing to government bans on weekday sport, the Melbourne Cup was run on a Saturday from 1942 to 1944.

References

 
Sports by year